Michael Elvers Tørnes (born 8 January 1986) is a Danish former professional footballer who played as a goalkeeper. He most recently played for Brøndby IF.

Club career

Brønshøj
Born in Herlev, Tørnes played for Herlev IF, Farum BK and Lyngby BK from a young age, Tørnes joined lower-league side Brønshøj BK preceding his release from Lyngby BK. After impressing at a young age, Tørnes made the move to Brøndby IF after a successful trial.

Brøndby
Tørnes had his debut for Brøndby IF in the 67th minute of a 0–0 draw against Flora Tallinn in the UEFA Cup, replacing goalkeeper Casper Ankergren who was sent off. Tørnes kept a clean sheet in the 4–0 second leg win on Brøndby Stadion, which he played for the whole 90 minutes. In the beginning of the 2010–11 season, Brøndby's first keeper Stephan Andersen, was long-term injured, resulting in Tørnes temporarily taking over his position.

Return to Brønshøj
Tørnes re-joined Brønshøj BK on loan for the start of the 2013–14 campaign, after failing to make an impression in the Brøndby IF side. On 28 July 2013, Tørnes made his Brønshøj BK return in a 4–1 defeat against Silkeborg IF.

HJK Helsinki
Tørnes joined Finnish side HJK on a free transfer after his release from Brøndby IF. During the 2014 season, Tørnes broke the clean sheet record for the Finnish Premier Division. Tørnes played 960 minutes consecutively without conceding a goal in either Finnish Premier Division matches or in Finnish Cup matches. Old record was 882 minutes by András Vilnrotter.

Sandefjord
After impressing in Finland, Tørnes joined Norwegian side Sandefjord on a free transfer after he rejected a new deal with HJK. On 19 April 2015, Tørnes made his Sandefjord debut in a 1–0 victory over Sarpsborg 08. Tørnes went on to appear in eight more league game before leaving on the expiry of his contract.

OB
On 13 August 2015, Tørnes returned to his home land; Denmark, to join OB on a one-year deal to provide back up to Sten Grytebust and Maksym Koval. Although Tørnes was back up, he made his debut on the opening game of the season in a 3–2 defeat against Randers. Tørnes went on to make three more consecutive appearances and continually provided competition for the number 1 spot.

Tørnes was eventually released at the end of his contract on 30 June 2016.

Vitesse
On 27 July 2016, Tørnes joined Eredivisie side Vitesse on a two-year deal, after a successful pre-season trial. On 14 December 2016, Tørnes made his Vitesse debut in a KNVB Cup tie against Jodan Boys, in which Vitesse won 4–0. Tørnes was a member of the squad that went on to win the KNVB Cup, earning Vitesse their first major trophy in their 125-year history.

On 29 March 2018, it was announced that Tørnes would be leaving Vitesse at the end of his contract in June.

Vendsyssel FF
On 31 August 2018, Tørnes signed a one-year deal with newly promoted Vendsyssel FF, replacing the outgoing Frederik Ibsen.

Return to Brøndby
Tørnes returned to Danish Superliga club Brøndby IF on 3 June 2019 on a one-year contract to provide cover for Marvin Schwäbe. He signed a one-year extension on 23 July 2020, where he would provided cover for starter Schwäbe and new backup Mads Hermansen. He ended the 2020–21 season with a Superliga Winner's medal, as Brøndby won their first league title in 16 years. 

He left the club after his contract expired in June 2021.

Career statistics

Honours
HJK Helsinki
 Veikkausliiga: 2014
 Finnish Cup: 2014

Vitesse
 KNVB Cup: 2016–17

Brøndby
 Royal League: 2006–07
 Danish Superliga: 2020–21

References

External links
 Michael Tørnes on OB website
 Danish national team profile
 

1986 births
Living people
Footballers from Copenhagen
Association football goalkeepers
Danish men's footballers
Denmark youth international footballers
Brøndby IF players
Danish Superliga players
Danish 1st Division players
Eliteserien players
Veikkausliiga players
Eredivisie players
Brønshøj Boldklub players
Helsingin Jalkapalloklubi players
Sandefjord Fotball players
Odense Boldklub players
SBV Vitesse players
Vendsyssel FF players
Danish expatriate men's footballers
Danish expatriate sportspeople in Norway
Danish expatriate sportspeople in Finland
Expatriate footballers in Norway
Expatriate footballers in Finland
Expatriate footballers in the Netherlands
People from Herlev Municipality
Herlev IF players